Ludovica Caramis (born 27 July 1991) is an Italian model and showgirl.

Biography 
Born in Rome to Italian parents, but with a paternal grandfather of Greek origin, her career began in 2009 with the participation in the beauty contest of Miss Italia, where she ranks among the first twenty. From that moment she starts her experience in the entertainment world: on Rai 1 from September 2011 to June 2017, she has participated (with Laura Forgia, Eleonora Cortini and Francesca Fichera) as a "professor" in the television show L'eredità, presented by Carlo Conti until 2014 and by Fabrizio Frizzi from 2014.

Personal life 
She got engaged to footballer Mattia Destro. The couple married on 1 September 2014, after two years of dating, in Ascoli Piceno. They have one son, Leone, born 8 September 2020.

References

1991 births
Living people
Italian female models
Italian people of Greek descent
Models from Rome
Association footballers' wives and girlfriends